Mohad Abdikadar Sheik Ali (born 12 June 1993 in Beled Hawo, Somalia) is a Somali-born Italian middle-distance runner competing primarily in the 1500 metres. He won a silver medal at the 2015 European U23 Championships in Tallinn.

Biography
He arrived in Sezze in January 2006, together with two brothers, as refugees escaping the Somali Civil War. He became a naturalised Italian citizen in May 2011.

International competitions

Personal bests
Outdoor
800 metres – 1:48.43 (Salzburg 2014)	
1000 metres – 2:19.4  (Cantalupa 2014)
1500 metres – 3:36.54 (Rome 2018)
One mile – 4:02.87 (Pavia 2014)
3000 metres – 8:09.09 (Trento 2017)
10 kilometres – 30:41 (Cuneo 2015)
Half marathon – 1:08:59 (Ostia 2017)
Indoor
800 metres – 1:50.67 (Ancona 2013)
1000 metres – 2:22.79 (Ancona 2014)
1500 metres – 3:42.53 (Ghent 2018)
3000 metres – 8:16.47 (Ancona 2015)

See also
Italy at the 2018 European Athletics Championships
Naturalized athletes of Italy

References

External links
 

1993 births
Living people
Italian male middle-distance runners
Italian sportspeople of African descent
Somalian emigrants to Italy
Athletics competitors of Centro Sportivo Aeronautica Militare
Naturalised citizens of Italy
Athletes (track and field) at the 2018 Mediterranean Games
Mediterranean Games competitors for Italy